Moranopteris achilleifolia is a species of fern in the family Polypodiaceae. It is native to Brazil and Argentina. It is also placed in the genus Grammitis.

Under the synonym Polypodium piligerum, in 2003, it was regarded as endemic to Ecuador and threatened by habitat loss. However, more recent sources do not record it as occurring in Ecuador.

References

Polypodiaceae
Flora of Brazil
Flora of Argentina
Taxonomy articles created by Polbot
Taxobox binomials not recognized by IUCN